The knockout stage of the 2013 CECAFA Cup began on 7 December with the quarter-finals and ended on 12 December with the final. Matches were played at the Mombasa Municipal Stadium in Mombasa and the Nyayo National Stadium in Nairobi. The Moi Stadium in Kisumu was originally scheduled to host the semi-finals, but the matches were moved to the Kenyatta Stadium in Machakos and the Mombasa Municipal Stadium to allow the stadium to be completely refurbished.

Format
The knockout stage involves the eight teams which advanced from the group stage: the top two teams from each group and the two best third-placed teams.

In this stage, teams play against each other once. The losers of the semi-finals play against each other in the third place playoff where the winners are placed third overall in the entire competition.

Of the Ksh. 8.7 million (approx. US$ 100,000) that has been allocated for prize money, the winners will receive Ksh. 5.6 million, while the runners-up will take home Ksh. 2.5 million. The third place playoff winners will receive Ksh. 600,000.

Match rules

Quarter-finals, third place playoff and final
 Regulation time is 90 minutes.
 If scores are still level after regulation time, there will be no extra time and a Penalty shoot-out decides the winner.
 Each team is allowed to have seven named substitutes.
 Each team is allowed to make a maximum of three substitutions.

Semi-finals rules
 Regulation time is 90 minutes.
 If scores are still level after regulation time, there will be 30 minutes of extra time and a Penalty shoot-out thereafter if scores are still level after extra time to decide the winner.
 Each team is allowed to have seven named substitutes.
 Each team is allowed to make a maximum of three substitutions.

Bracket

Fixtures

Quarter-finals

Semi-finals

Third place playoff

Final

Top scorers (at the knockout stage)

2 goals

  Allan Wanga
  Salah Ibrahim
  Mrisho Ngasa
  Ronald Kampamba

1 goal

  Jockins Atudo
  Clifton Miheso
  Miaaz Abdelrahim
  Mbwana Samatta
  Martin Kayongo-Mutumba
  Dan Sserunkuma

1 own goal
  Saladin Bargecho (playing against Sudan)

References

knockout stage